The Pasonanca Natural Park is a protected area that preserves a major watershed in the southern Philippine island of Mindanao in the Zamboanga Peninsula. It contains the headwaters of the Tumaga River in the southern Zamboanga Cordillera mountain range that serves the water requirements of some 800,000 residents in Zamboanga City. It was named after the village of Pasonanca located in the city's northern fringes where the Pasonanca Park, a public eco-park, and the Abong-Abong Park, a pilgrimage site, can also be found.

The natural park is managed as part of the Philippines' National Integrated Protected Areas System. It was initially established in 1987 as the Pasonanca Watershed Forest Reserve encompassing an initial area of  declared through Proclamation No. 199 issued by President Corazon Aquino. In 1999, through Proclamation No. 132 issued by President Joseph Estrada, the park was enlarged and reclassified as a natural park. It has the largest remaining block of old growth lowland dipterocarp forest in Zamboanga.

Description

It is contained within the local government areas of Pasonanca, Lunzuran, Lumayang Cacao, Lapacan, Lamisan, Bungiao, La Paz, Balurno and Dulian in Zamboanga City and parts of the municipality of Sibuco in Zamboanga del Norte. It is crossed by Tumaga River and its tributaries which serve the bulk of the water supply for the Zamboanga City Water District through a diversion dam. The park also contains several rock formations, springs and waterfalls including the Dulian Falls.

The park is composed of 60% old growth and secondary growth forests with the remaining areas devoted to agricultural lands, coconut plantations, and built up areas. It has a rolling terrain with moderate to steep slopes. Facilities within the park include a clonal nursery, four outposts, an information center and a wildlife rescue center. There are also a few resorts, a hotel, cottages and restaurants near the park's entrance in Pasonanca.

It is easily accessible from the Zamboanga International Airport via the Pasonanca–Santa Maria Road.

Wildlife
The Pasonanca Natural Park provides a habitat to many threatened and restricted-range species of the Mindanao and Eastern Visayas Endemic Bird Area including the Zamboanga bulbul, Mindanao bleeding-heart, Philippine kingfisher, Philippine leafbird and little slaty flycatcher. It also supports the Philippine eagle, Mindanao broadbill, azure-breasted pitta, celestial monarch, southern silvery kingfisher, blue-capped kingfisher, spotted imperial pigeon, giant scops owl, Japanese night heron, Chinese egret, rufous-lored kingfisher, Philippine dwarf kingfisher and Philippine cockatoo.

References

Natural parks of the Philippines
Geography of Zamboanga City
Geography of Zamboanga del Norte
Tourist attractions in Zamboanga City
Protected areas established in 1987
1987 establishments in the Philippines